Dudua siderea is a species of moth of the family Tortricidae. It is found in Australia, where it has been recorded from Queensland.

The wingspan is about 17 mm. The forewings are brown, with dark fuscous transverse lines and whitish costal  strigulae (fine streaks), as well as leaden-grey or steely-grey transverse lines or fasciae. The hindwings are grey. The natural posture of the adults has the head and thorax curved upwards, resembling the posture of various leafhopper species.

References

Moths described in 1881
Olethreutini